Jordan competed at the 1984 Summer Paralympics in Stoke Mandeville, Great Britain and New York City, United States. 9 competitors from Jordan won 3 medals, 1 silver and 2 bronze and finished joint 39th in the medal table with Zimbabwe.

See also 
 Jordan at the Paralympics
 Jordan at the 1984 Summer Olympics

References 

Jordan at the Paralympics
1984 in Jordanian sport
Nations at the 1984 Summer Paralympics